Lowesville is an unincorporated community in Nelson County, Virginia, United States.  It lies along the path of the now-defunct Virginia Blue Ridge Railway.

Hite Store was added to the National Register of Historic Places in 1997.

References

GNIS reference

Unincorporated communities in Nelson County, Virginia
Unincorporated communities in Virginia